is a 1960 Japanese crime mystery film directed by Akira Kurosawa. It was the first film to be produced under Kurosawa's own independent production company. It was entered into the 11th Berlin International Film Festival.

The film stars Toshiro Mifune as a young man who gets a prominent position in a corrupt postwar Japanese company in order to expose the men responsible for his father's death. It has its roots in Shakespeare's Hamlet, while also doubling as a critique of corporate corruption. It is one of four films, along with Drunken Angel (1948), Stray Dog (1949) and High and Low (1963), in which Kurosawa explores the film noir genre. Like Kurosawa and Mifune's next two movies, Yojimbo (1961) and Sanjuro (1962), Mifune's character is "a lone hero fighting against overwhelming odds and corrupt authorities."

Plot
A group of news reporters watch and gossip, at an elaborate wedding reception held by the Public Development Corporation's Vice President Iwabuchi who married his daughter Yoshiko to his secretary Koichi Nishi. The police interrupt the wedding to arrest corporate assistant officer Wada, who is the reception's master of ceremony, on charges of bribery in a kickback scheme. The reporters comment this incident is similar to an earlier scandal involving Iwabuchi, administrative officer Moriyama, and contract officer Shirai that was hushed up after the suicide of Assistant Chief Furuya, who had jumped from a seventh story window of the corporate office building, which brought to a dead end  the investigation, before any of the company's higher-ups could be implicated. Following the wedding, the police question Wada and accountant Miura about bribery between Dairyu Construction Company and the government-funded Public Corporation.

Following the inquiry, Miura commits suicide by running in front of a truck when about to be arrested. Wada attempts to take his own life by jumping into an active volcano. But Nishi, pursuing Wada, stops the suicide  attempt. To convince Wada to help him and his best friend Itakura in their agenda of revenge, Nishi then drives Wada where they both are shown spying on the (pre-scripted) funeral, that reveals to Wada what his employers thought of him. Nishi then focuses his efforts on contract officer Shirai by setting him up so that Iwabuchi and Moriyama believe him to be stealing from them, while also using Wada to drive him insane with guilt. Nishi then saves Shirai from an assassin hired by Iwabuchi before taking him to the office where Furuya died, revealing himself as Furuya's illegitimate son who exchanged identities with Itakura to avenge his father's death. Nishi's interrogation methods shatter what little sanity Shirai had left, with Moriyama deducing that someone connected to Furuya is orchestrating these events as he soon learns the truth about Nishi and informs Iwabuchi. Iwabuchi's son Tatsuo overhears and angrily drives Nishi off when he returns to the house.

Retreating to the ruins of a factory he worked at during World War II, Nishi managed to abduct Moriyama and starves him into revealing the location of evidence he can use to expose the corruption and all involved to the press. In the meantime, Wada slipped away and brought back Yoshiko in the hopes that the newlyweds will reconcile. Nishi tells his wife that he has grown to truly love her. Yoshiko accepts the truth about her father's evil deeds and reluctantly agrees to allow Nishi to complete his plans to expose him. But as calls for a press conference to be held the next day and prepares to retrieve the final evidence, Iwabuchi deduces Yoshiko saw Nishi and tricks her by claiming Tatsuo intends to kill Nishi while promising to turn himself in. She offers to go with Iwabuchi, but he drugs his daughter with wine laced with sleeping pills.

Yoshiko comes to by the time Tatsuo returns home from duck hunting, realizing her father tricked her as they rush to Nishi's location. But they are too late, Itakura revealing that Nishi had been killed under the cover of drunk driving accident with Wada, Moriyama, and the evidence all disposed of. All three are devastated by this development, knowing the truth but having nothing to back up their story. Following him canceling Nishi's conference, his children disowning him before leaving him. Iwabuchi receives a call from his superior and apologizes for the recent trouble while assuring them that he handled it. He then requests retirement, but his superior advises him to take a vacation. Iwabuchi proceeds to hang up after apologizing, as he lost his sense of time from having not slept at all the previous night.

Cast

 Toshiro Mifune - Kōichi Nishi
 Masayuki Mori - Public Corporation Vice President Iwabuchi
 Kyōko Kagawa - Yoshiko Nishi
 Tatsuya Mihashi - Tatsuo Iwabuchi
 Takashi Shimura - Administrative Officer Moriyama
 Kō Nishimura - Contract Officer Shirai
 Takeshi Katō - Itakura
 Kamatari Fujiwara - Assistant-to-the-Chief Wada
 Chishū Ryū - Public Prosecutor Nonaka
 Seiji Miyaguchi - Prosecutor Okakura
 Kōji Mitsui - Reporter
 Ken Mitsuda - Public Corporation President Arimura
 Nobuo Nakamura - Legal Adviser
 Susumu Fujita - Detective
 Kōji Nanbara - Prosecutor Horiuchi

Production

While a critical and commercial success, Toho Studios grew frustrated with Kurosawa going overbudget during filming of The Hidden Fortress, and in response, Kurosawa decided to form his film company Kurosawa Productions in 1959. As his first independent film, Kurosawa believed that it would be insulting to the audience to make a movie with the intention of only making money and decided that his next film would be about a subject of social significance.

The idea for The Bad Sleep Well came from Kurosawa's nephew Yoshio Inoue, whose story called "Bad Men's Prosperity" was used as the basis for Kurosawa's draft. Kurosawa began writing the script with Eijirō Hisaita, whom he had collaborated with on No Regrets for Our Youth and The Idiot, both starring Setsuko Hara. Kurosawa's other writing collaborators Hideo Oguni, Ryūzō Kikushima and Shinobu Hashimoto would later join Kurosawa and Hisaita in the writing process once they were free from other projects. The process of writing the script took 80 days, with the script being carefully written to not resemble actual real-life cases of corruption in Japan.

Filming began in March 22, 1960, with the Navy Yard of Toyohashi, Mount Aso, Marunouchi Building and the Yokohama Prison serving as main locations for the film. To convincingly play the part of a disabled wife, Kyōko Kagawa used uneven shoes and a knee brace. During filming of a car scene, Kagawa suffered injuries in her face and considered quitting her acting career. At the hospital where she was being treated, Toshiro Mifune stopped the press from interviewing her by standing in front of the door to her room.

Reception
Contemporary reviews were positive, with a Bosley Crowther piece in The New York Times from January 1963 calling it ”an aggressive and chilling drama of modern-day Japan” which ”gives to an ordinary tale of greedy and murderous contention a certain basic philosophical tone”. It praises Kurosawa for staging ”what amounts to cliches in this type of strongarm fiction in a way that makes them seem fresh and as fully of sardonic humor as though we had never seen their likes before”. Dan Schneider considers it one of Kurosawa’s finest movies.

The most common criticism of the film among professional reviewers refers to the ending. In a 2006 review of the Criterion Collection DVD release, The A.V. Club's Keith Phipps calls it "an assured, muscular Kurosawa film [...] that it's all the more disappointing when a shapeless, anticlimactic, but probably inevitable ending does it in".

At the 14th Mainichi Film Awards, Masayuki Mori and Masaru Sato won the awards for Best Supporting Actor and Best Music.

American filmmaker Francis Ford Coppola has listed The Bad Sleep Well as one of his favorite films, citing the first thirty minutes of the film "as perfect as any film I've ever seen" and used it as inspiration for the wedding sequence in the 1972 Oscar-winning gangster drama The Godfather.

References

External links
 
 
 
 The Bad Sleep Well  at the Japanese Movie Database
 The Bad Sleep Well: The Higher Depths, an essay by Chuck Stephens at the Criterion Collection
 

1960 films
1960 crime drama films
Japanese crime drama films
1960s Japanese-language films
Japanese black-and-white films
Films based on Hamlet
Films directed by Akira Kurosawa
Films produced by Tomoyuki Tanaka
Films scored by Masaru Sato
Films set in Japan
Modern adaptations of works by William Shakespeare
Films with screenplays by Akira Kurosawa
Films with screenplays by Hideo Oguni
Films with screenplays by Shinobu Hashimoto
Films with screenplays by Ryuzo Kikushima
Toho films
1960s Japanese films